Jabolci is a village in the municipality of Sopište, North Macedonia.

Demographics
In statistics gathered by Vasil Kanchov in 1900, the village was inhabited by 180 Muslim Albanians and 130 Bulgarian Exarchists. 

According to the 2002 census, the village had a total of 41 inhabitants. Ethnic groups in the village include:

Macedonians 26
Albanians 15

References

Villages in Sopište Municipality
Albanian communities in North Macedonia